Heiko Wildberg (born 19 May 1952) is a German politician for the Alternative for Germany (AfD) and since 2017 member of the Bundestag.

Life and politics

Wildberg was born 1952 in the West German town of Wilhelmshaven. He studied geology and achieved his PhD in 1983. He entered the populist AfD in 2016 and became member of the Bundestag in 2017.

Wildberg denies the scientific consensus on climate change.

Wilberg started not in 2021 German federal election

References

1952 births
People from Wilhelmshaven
Members of the Bundestag for Rhineland-Palatinate
Living people
Members of the Bundestag 2017–2021
Members of the Bundestag for the Alternative for Germany